A super two, super two-lane highway or wide two-lane is a two-lane surface road built to highway standards with wide lanes and other safety features normally present on a freeway with more lanes, typically including partial control of access, occasional passing lanes and hard shoulders. It is often built for eventual conversion to freeway or at least divided-highway status once traffic volumes rise. Super twos have also been employed because of environmental concerns, such as where Interstate 93 becomes a super two in Franconia Notch, New Hampshire, United States.

Ireland

In the Republic of Ireland, the term wide two-lane is used by the National Roads Authority. In policy documents, the designation WS2 is used, which is also used in the UK for a wide single carriageway.

Wide two-lane roads are common on national roads, both on less important but medium-capacity routes, and on more important routes not yet upgraded to dual carriageway or motorway. Wide two-lane roads in the Irish Republic generally have hard shoulders and are undivided single carriageway. Grade separation of junctions has been used in some instances—for example, the N20 bypassing Croom. Most wide two-lane roads are wide enough that a vehicle may overtake another without crossing the center line if the vehicle in front pulls into the hard shoulder (the carriageway including hard shoulders is 15–17 meters wide).

Many future Irish road schemes will use 2+1 roads or 2+2 roads, as opposed to wide two-lane, which may better suit lower capacities than does 2+1. Wide two-lane, if finished to high quality with grade separated interchanges, has been shown to lead drivers into a false sense of security (from the apparently high speed road) and more dangerous driving (because the carriageways are not separated).

Texas
In Texas, a two-lane highway that has an alternating passing lane is called a Super 2, but it is actually a 2+1 road.

Ontario 
The Southwest Bypass of Sudbury, Ontario is currently at Super 2 standards. There is one interchange and four at-grade, unsignalized intersections along an 11.3 km stretch of 2-lane highway; between being divided at interchanges on either end. While plans have existed since the 1967 "Planning Study for the Sudbury Southwest By-Pass", there is currently not funding in place to twin the bypass to a full 4-lane expressway.

See also 
2+1 road
Two-lane expressway

References

Types of roads
Highways